Écorches is a commune in the Orne department in northwestern France. It is the birth place of Charlotte Corday, Girondist and assassin of Marat.

Notable people

Charlotte Corday (1768–1793) was born here, in the hamlet of Saint-Saturnin-des-Ligneries.

See also
Communes of the Orne department

References

Communes of Orne